Lyublino is a Moscow Metro station in the Lyublino District, South-Eastern Administrative Okrug, Moscow. It is on the Lyublinsko-Dmitrovskaya Line, between Volzhskaya and Bratislavskaya stations.

Lyublino opened on 25 December 1996 as part of the second stage of the southeast extension of the Lyublinsky radius. The station is a level single vault design with the main theme (architects V.Filippov and S.Belyakova) is dedicated to the architecture of the towns that are located in Moscow's outskirts (the district of Lyublino was originally a town before being swallowed by Moscow when the city expanded in 1961).

The station consists of two vaulted halves which stop in the apex of the vault where a niche containing the lighting effects is located, which runs the length of the ceiling. The white vaulted halves gently transform into the station walls which are revetted with dark marble in the lower half. Just above the exit portals are two medallions showing the coat of arms of the Lyublino district.

The station has two underground vestibules under the Krasnodarskaya and Sovkhoznaya streets, the exits are covered with closed metallic pavilions.

External links
 Mosmetro.ru
 Mymetro.ru
 News.metro.ru
 Metro.ru
 KartaMetro.info — Station location and exits on Moscow map (English/Russian)

Moscow Metro stations
Railway stations in Russia opened in 1996
Lyublinsko-Dmitrovskaya Line
Railway stations located underground in Russia